The Civil Contingencies Secretariat (CCS), created in July 2001, is the executive department of the British Cabinet Office responsible for emergency planning in the UK.  The role of the secretariat is to ensure the United Kingdom's resilience against disruptive challenge, and to do this by working with others to anticipate, assess, prevent, prepare, respond and recover.  Until its creation in 2001, emergency planning in Britain was the responsibility of the Home Office. The CCS also supports the Civil Contingencies Committee, also known as COBR (or popularly – but incorrectly – as COBRA).

Formation

In the aftermath of the Y2K bug scare, the fuel protests of 2000, flooding in autumn 2000, and the foot and mouth epidemic of 2001 the UK government felt that the existing emergency management policies and structures were inadequate to deal with natural or man-made disasters, and formed the Civil Contingencies Secretariat in July 2001, located in the Cabinet Office. Soon after the 9/11 attacks the remit of the CCS was expanded to include mitigating the consequences of a large scale terrorist attack.

Until 2001 the Home Office carried out emergency preparedness planning through its Emergency Planning Division, which in turn replaced the Home Defence and Emergency Services Division. From 1935 to 1971 a separate department, called the Civil Defence Department (in the early years the Air Raid Precautions Department, Ministry of Home Security), existed.

Remit and reporting

In 2002 David Blunkett, then Home Secretary, stated, in a written reply to a parliamentary question: 

He went on to state:

The Civil Contingencies Committee, often informally referred to as COBR from the name of the room used, is a forum for ministers and senior officials to discuss and manage serious (level 2) and catastrophic (level 3) emergencies.

In 2010, the secretariat launched an emergency communications service based on the Skynet military communication satellite system, called High Integrity Telecommunications System, for use by UK police and other emergency services, primarily at Strategic Command Centres and at major events and emergencies. It replaced the earlier Emergency Communications Network.

Serco operates the Emergency Planning College in Easingwold, North Yorkshire under contract to the secretariat.

Structure

The secretariat is led by a director and initially comprised five divisions dealing with:

Assessment  assessing known risks and scanning for future potential risks
Capability Management  working with departments facing potential disruption, and advising on how to prevent or manage crisis
Communication and Learning  including the News Co-ordination Centre in the Cabinet Office and the Emergency Planning College
National Resilience Framework  developing partnerships between governmental agencies, voluntary agencies, local communities and private sector groups
Programme Co-ordination  providing secretariat support for the Civil Contingencies Committee

In 2012, the CCS still had five sections, with a slightly different emphasis:

Capabilities
Local Response Capabilities
Emergency Planning College
Horizon Scanning & Response
Natural Hazards Team

Director of the Civil Contingencies Secretariat
Mike Granatt, CB (20012002)
Susan Scholefield, CMG (20022004)
Bruce Mann (20042009)
Christina Scott (20092013)
Campbell McCafferty (20132016)
Katharine Hammond (20162020) 
Roger Hargreaves (2020present)

Documents issued

The CCS has produced the following documents:
Emergency Response and Recovery which provides non-statutory guidance to accompany the Civil Contingencies Act 2004. First published in November 2005, it was last updated in October 2013.

See also
 Civil Contingencies Committee
 CONOPS
 Joint Terrorism Analysis Centre
 Centre for the Protection of National Infrastructure
 Defence and Overseas Secretariat
 Economic and Domestic Affairs Secretariat
 European Secretariat
 Federal Emergency Management Agency, US counterpart
 Operation Yellowhammer

References

External links
Emergency planning – from Gov.uk
Risk assessment: how the risk of emergencies in the UK is assessed – from Gov.uk
Preparation and planning for emergencies: the National Resilience Capabilities Programme – from Gov.uk

UKResilience twitter account – from the Civil Contingencies Secretariat
Emergency Planning Society – official website

Emergency management in the United Kingdom
Cabinet Office (United Kingdom)